The Slavic-derived stem "Drag-" appears in many East-European proper names. These include:

 Draga, Dragan, Drăgan,  Dragana, Dragas
 Drăghici
 Dragi, Dragić, Dragica, Dragiša, Dragivoje
 Drago, Dragoş, Dragoljub, Dragomir, Dragoslav, Dragoslavele, Dragović
 Dragu, Drăguș, Drăguşeni, Dragutin, Dragutinović
 Dragnea
 Drga

Slavic given names